Eudoliche is a genus of moths in the subfamily Arctiinae. The genus was erected by Heinrich Benno Möschler in 1878.

Species
 Eudoliche longa Schaus, 1905
 Eudoliche major Rothschild, 1913
 Eudoliche osvalda Schaus, 1924
 Eudoliche vittata Möschler, 1878

References

External links

Lithosiini
Moth genera